Sequiera is a village ("pueblo") in the south of the Artigas Department in northwestern Uruguay.

Geography

History
The name comes from the Guaraní-mission commander Ramón Sequeira, who in 1832 rebelled against the government of Fructuoso Rivera. On June 5 of that year Sequeira was surprised and defeated by troops led by Bernabé Rivera on the  Arapey Chico.

In 1997 a tornado swept through the town, destroyed traditional wood and mud huts Sequeira was completely rebuilt with more solid buildings that are distributed on both sides of Route 4.

Its status was elevated to "Pueblo" (village) by the Act of Ley 17.413 on 2 November 2001.

Population
In 2011, Sequiera had a population of 1149.
 
Source: Instituto Nacional de Estadística de Uruguay

Life expectancy
Sequeira is noted for having an unusually high number of centenarians. In 2003 these were Marta Caballero (102), Augusta Rodríguez Mezquita (113), Francisca Paz (101), Maneca Tejeira (106) and Bartolo Díaz (106).

Economy
It is a major service centre for sheep farming.

References

External links
INE map of Sequeira

Populated places in the Artigas Department